Vizhenan Rural District is a rural district (dehestan) in the Central District of Gilan-e Gharb County, Kermanshah Province, Iran. At the 2006 census, its population was 2,515, in 540 families. The rural district has 22 villages.

References 

Rural Districts of Kermanshah Province
Gilan-e Gharb County